Nicuesa is a genus of true bugs belonging to the family Lygaeidae.

The species of this genus are found in Central America.

Species:

Nicuesa affinis 
Nicuesa oculata 
Nicuesa speciosa

References

Lygaeidae